A dera is a type of socio-religious organization in northern India. Jacob Copeman defines the deras as "monasteries or the extended residential sites of religious leaders; frequently just glossed as sect".

Several deras started out as non-orthodox Sikh sects, and many of them are now centres of distinct non-Sikh religious movements. Many Deras have attracted a large number of outcast Dalits, who earlier embraced Sikhism to escape the Hindu casteism, but felt socially excluded by the Jat Sikh-dominated clerical establishment.

History 

The word Dera derives from the Persian word Derah or Dirah, which literally means a camp, abode, monastery or convent.

The phenomenon of Dera, as sectarian institution, is not new in Punjab and it is much older than the Sikh faith and Panth. Deras in Punjab, before the Sikh faith, belonged to Sufi Pirs, Yogi Naths, and Sants of Bhakti movement. In Punjab, the popularity of Sufi Pirs/Sants or their Shrines can be seen through their veneration across the communities such as Hindu, Sikh and Muslim. Shrines of Sufis were known as khanqahs. The major function of khanqah was to provide relief to people of all communities, particularly the lower strata of different communities. Several khanqahs were built and facilities were provided to lower castes of Hindu populace in rural areas. Khanqahs with modest hospitality and generosity offered spiritual guidance, psychological support and counseling that was free and open to all people. By doing so, khanqahs challenged the establishment of stratified social structure either Hindu or Muslim societies. Soon, khanqahs became epicenters of socio-cultural and theological activities of people from all ethnic and religious backgrounds and genders. Sufi shrines of Sakhi Sarvar Sultan, Sheikh Farid, Bulhe Shah, Sheikh Fattha, Khwaja Khizr, and Five Pirs (Panj Pir) were the manifestation of the shared devoutness of Punjabis.

During the lifetime of the Sikh Gurus, several deras had been established, many of them by the rival claimants to the "Guru" title. These deras included those of the Udasis, the Minas, the Dhirmalias, the Ramraiyas, the Handalis, and the Massandis. During the consolidation of the Sikh religion, several more deras cropped up. These included the deras of Bandei Khalsa (Bandapanthis), Nanakpanthis, Sewapanthis, Bhaktpanthi, Suthrashahi, Gulabdasi, Nirmalas and the Nihangs.

19th century onwards, several more deras came into being. The distinguishing characteristic of these new deras was that they acted as centres of Dalit mobilization. The majority of the followers of these deras were people of Dalit background, who had embraced Sikhism to escape the casteist Hindu varna system. However, they continued to experience social exclusion in the caste hierarchy of the Sikh society, which pushed them towards the deras and other organizations that promise social equality. The increasing politicization of the Sikh institutions - the Akal Takht and the SGPC - and their domination by Jat Sikhs has driven a large number of people to the Deras as well. The affluent Dalits among the Punjabi diaspora have also contributed to the growth of the deras.

Major deras 

According to a 2006-2007 study, there were more than 9,000 Sikh and non-Sikh deras in the rural areas of Punjab. A number of deras are also located in the neighbouring states of Haryana, Rajasthan and Uttar Pradesh.

Sikh deras 

The Sikh deras strictly observe the Rehat Maryada (Sikh code of conduct). The majority of their followers and leaders are from the Jat Sikh community. The leaders of these deras are rarely non-Jat, and never a Dalit. However, there are several Dalit sewadars, granthis, ragis, and kirtan performers in these deras.

Some of the prominent Sikh deras include those of:

 Damdami Taksal-led Sant Samaj
 Dera Nanaksar
 Sant Ajit Singh Hansali at Hansali sahib
 Sant Daya Singh Sursingh Wale
 Sant Sewa Singh Rampur Khera
 Parmeshwar Dwar Gurmat Prachar Sewa Mission
 Dera Baba Rumi Wala (Bhucho Kalan)

Non-Sikh deras 

The non-Sikh deras do not abide by the Sikh Rehyat Maryada. Along with the Sikh gurbani, they also recite non-Sikh texts, and some of them also indulge in idol worship. Unlike the Sikh deras, where the holy book Guru Granth Sahib is considered as the only current guru, the non-Sikh deras practice devotion towards a contemporary human guru.

Some of the major non-Sikh deras include:

 Radha Soami Satsang Beas (Dera Beas)
 Dera Sacha Sauda
 Sant Nirankari Mission
 Namdharis
 Divya Jyoti Sansthan
 Bhaniarawala Dera
 Dera Baba Bhuman Shah (Sanghar Sadha)
 Ravidasis (including Dera Sach Khand )

The majority of the followers of these deras are Dalits, Backward castes, and the poor among the Jat Sikhs. However, most of the deras are led by people from upper-caste backgrounds. As of 2007, the Nirankaris were led by a Khatri; the Dera Sacha Sauda was led by a Jat Sikh of Sidhu sub-caste; and the Radha Saomis were led by a Jat Sikh of the Dhillon sub-caste.

The Dalit-dominated deras have emerged as major centres of counter-culture, where the Dalits assert their pride, customs and tradition.

Conflicts with the Khalsa Sikhs 

The deras are seen as a challenge to the mainstream Sikhism represented by the Khalsa Sikh identity. The total number of the followers of the various deras far exceeds the number of followers of the Golden Temple-based clerical establishment (the Akal Takht).

The tensions between the Dalits and the Jats have manifested in form of conflicts involving the Deras. Some of these incidents include:

 Sikh–Nirankari clashes (1978)
 In 1978, the orthodox Sikhs denounced the Sant Nirankaris as false Sikhs, and demanded closure of all the Nirankari centres. In 1978, some Sikhs tried to forcibly shut down the annual Nirankari convention in Amritsar. In the ensuing clash, 12 Sikhs and 3 Nirankaris were killed. In 1980, the Nirankari leader Gurbachan Singh was shot dead.

 Bhaniarawala crisis (2001)
 The dera leader Piara Singh Bhaniara imitated Guru Gobind Singh, and launched a new holy book Bhavsagar Granth, after his followers were disallowed from carrying the Sikh holy book Guru Granth Sahib. This led to violent clashes between the Khalsa Sikhs and the followers of Bhaniara.

 Meham dispute (2006)
 In the Meham village, the Ad Dharmi Dalits had been maintaining the Udasi dera of Baba Khazan Singh for six decades. They offered liquor as prasad at the dera, and also distributed it among the devotees. In 2003, the Sikhs placed a copy of Guru Granth Sahib at the dera, and later objected to the liquor offering, arguing that it was against the Sikh Rehat Maryada. In 2006, they forcibly took control of the dera, and replaced all Udasi symbols with the Khalsa symbols. This led to a clash between the two communities. However, the timely police intervention prevented escalations. The dera was placed under a government official, and the dispute was referred to the court.

 Vienna killings (2007)
 On 25 May 2007, six orthodox Sikhs attacked the Ravidassia members of Dera Sach Khand with a gun and knives, at a gurdwara in Vienna, Austria. The Dera leader Niranjan Das, who was visiting the gurdwara built by the Dera members, was seriously wounded in the attack. Two people died in the attack, including Das' deputy Rama Nand. The incident led to clashes in India as well, and prompted the Ravidassias to explicitly declare their religion as separate from Sikhism.

 Sikh-Dera Sacha Sauda clashes (2007)
 In 2007, the Dera Sacha Sauda leader Gurmeet Ram Rahim Singh was accused of imitating the Sikh Guru Gobind Singh. The resulting controversy escalated to civil unrest in Punjab, Haryana, Rajasthan and Delhi. Several people were killed in the clashes, and in 2008, there was an attempt to assassinate the Dera leader.

Politics 

Various political parties, including the Shiromani Akali Dal, and the Bharatiya Janata Party, and the Indian National Congress, have patronized the deras to attract the Dalit vote bank. During the election season, several political leaders and candidates visit the Deras, seeking support from the leaders of the various deras. This trend first became visible during the 1997 Punjab Legislative Assembly elections.

The Akali Dal has openly sought electoral support from the Sikh deras. The Sant Samaj deras have openly supported Akali Dal.

Among the non-Sikh deras, the Dera Sacha Sauda is influential in the Malwa region, and has a political wing. It has supported multiple political parties in various elections. The Dera Sach Khand asked its Dalit followers to vote for the Bahujan Samaj Party in 2012 Punjab elections, which was responsible for the dismal performance of the Congress in the Doaba region. The Bhaniarwala Dera has not openly supported any political party, but disfavours the Akali Dal candidates. The Dera Beas (Radha Soami) has not openly supported any particular party either, but in the past it used to tilt towards the Congress. In the 2012 Punjab elections, it favoured the Akali Dal, after daughter of a former Dera chief married an Akali Dal leader.

References

Bibliography 

 
 
 
 
 
 
 
 
 

New religious movements
Religious organisations based in India